Eqrem Bey Vlora (1 December 1885 – 30 March 1964) was an Albanian lord, politician, writer, and one of the delegates to the Assembly of Vlorë, which proclaimed the Albanian Declaration of Independence on November 28, 1912. He is described as The Last of Beys, the embodiment of the Albanian aristocracy of the time, although he came from a caste founded on the principles of Ottoman military fief.

Early life
Eqrem Vlora was born on 1 December 1885, in Vlorë, Ottoman Empire (today Albania), to Syrja Bey Vlora, a diplomat and politician, as well as a member of one of the wealthiest landowning families of the South Albania, and Mihri Vlora, member of one of the prominent families of Central Albania, the Toptani family. His uncle, Mehmed Ferid Pasha, who was his father's older brother served as Grand Vizier of the Ottoman Empire. He was related both to Ismail Qemali and also to his main political opponent Esad Pasha, who were both his first cousins from his father's and mother's side respectively. Eqrem grew up in his hometown and received his first lessons from private teachers, given the fact that his family was relatively wealthy not only in the region but throughout Janina Vilayet. According to his memoirs written later while living in Austria, he writes that his first teachers were Luigi Beccali, an Italian from Messina, and Mehmet Effendi Lusi who served as imam in Kaninë, a nearby town. The latter taught him theology, a subject that was essential for the children of families with such status in the Ottoman provinces. He was educated at the Theresianum in Vienna, 1899–1903, and studied law and religion in Istanbul, 1904. After working for the Ottoman Foreign Ministry for a time, including a three-month tour of duty at the Ottoman embassy in St. Petersburg in 1907, and years of travel in Europe, Albania and the Orient, he joined his uncle Ismail Qemali in the movement for Albanian independence. During these travels he met some of the most important personalities of the time, including Herbert Kitchener, Franz Conrad von Hotzendorf, several Arab sheikhs who would become the monarchs of the Arab countries and also a young lieutenant, Mustafa Kemal, who would eventually become the president of Turkey. According to Vlora's memoirs, members of his family were de facto (not de jure) sanjakbeys of Sanjak of Avlona in period 1481–1828.

Balkan Wars
In mid-October, Vlora arrived in Vienna after being sent on a mission by Albanian notables of middle and south central Albania to seek support from Austro-Hungarian officials regarding Albania's future and its borders especially along the Kalamas river and the inclusion of Chameria up to Preveza. During the Balkan Wars, he was given the rank of reserve major and the command of a territorial battalion (composed of Albanians) for the defense of Vlora by the Ottoman Empire commander in Ioannina. After several  skirmishes with the Greek forces in the area of Himarë, he was recalled to Vlora by his uncle, Ismail bey.

Albanian state

In 1912, he was made deputy president of the senate. He was sent in Neuwied to meet the Prince Wilhelm of Wied, chosen to rule Albania. Later, he served in the Foreign Ministry during the Prince's reign and was distinguished as the commander of a volunteer artillery battery during the attack of peasant rebels on  Durrës. He also received the Order of the Eagle for gallantry shown during the siege. He was a known supporter of the Central Powers during World War I for which reason he kept under arrest in Italy during most of the war but subsequently became a promoter of close relations between Italy and Albania. He was friendly towards the Italian commanders during the Italian invasion of Vlora in 1920. Vlora was elected to parliament in 1924, representing a conservative wing and, in 1925, became a senator for a short period of time. His relations with Ahmet Zogu were tenuous, though he served the latter on various diplomatic missions abroad. He was a close friend of the Bavarian baroness Marie Amelie, Freiin von Godin, with whom he translated the Kanun of Lekë Dukagjini into German.

Collaboration

Vlora welcomed the Italian invasion of April 1939 and had close links to the Italian fascists. In 1942, Mustafa Merlika-Kruja appointed him Minister for Kosovo, the western half of which had been incorporated to Albania. His anti-Slavic policies, however, gave rise to widespread resistance among the Serbs and Montenegrins. In the summer of 1944, he was made Foreign Minister and Minister of Justice before going into Italian exile during the communist takeover. He died in Vienna and was buried at the Neustift am Walde Cemetery till 30 March 2014. Since 30 March 2014 his remains were reinterred in Vlorë.

Writer
As a writer, Eqrem bej Vlora is remembered for his monograph Aus Berat und vom Tomor: Tagebuchblätter ('From Berat and Tomorr: Pages of a Diary'), Sarajevo 1911, and, in particular, for his two-volume German-language memoirs, published posthumously as Lebenserinnerungen ('Memoirs'), Munich 1968, 1973, which provide insight into the world of an early 20th-century Albanian nobleman. Unpublished remains his monumental 1200-page typescript Beiträge zur Geschichte der Osmanienherrschaft in Albanien: eine historische Skizze ('Contributions to the History of Ottoman Rule in Albania: an Historical Sketch'), from which this account of the noble families of Medieval Albania is taken.

References

Sources
 This article includes the text from Robert Elsie's personal site with explicit permission of the site author to use it under GNU FDL.
 "History of Albanian People" Albanian Academy of Science. 
 

1885 births
1964 deaths
20th-century Albanian politicians
20th-century Albanian historians
People from Vlorë
People from Janina vilayet
20th-century Albanian military personnel
Government ministers of Albania
Foreign ministers of Albania
Civil servants from the Ottoman Empire
20th-century Ottoman military personnel
Albanian collaborators with Fascist Italy
Albanian orientalists
German-language writers
Albanian male writers
German–Albanian translators
20th-century translators
Albanian–German translators
All-Albanian Congress delegates
Ambassadors of Albania to Greece
Ambassadors of Albania to the United Kingdom
20th-century male writers
Vlora family
Istanbul University Faculty of Law alumni
Male non-fiction writers